Ramasamy Uthurusamy is a computer engineer at Oakland University in Rochester, Michigan. He was named a Fellow of the Institute of Electrical and Electronics Engineers (IEEE) in 2013 for his contributions to data mining and artificial intelligence.

References

Fellow Members of the IEEE
Living people
Year of birth missing (living people)
Place of birth missing (living people)
Oakland University faculty